James Bailey (born 5 August 1983) is an English rugby union player who plays primarily as a wing. He has played for London Wasps, Lyon, Bristol and Gloucester.

Career

Bailey joined Gloucester Rugby from Bristol Rugby in 2004, having scored 14 tries in 21 matches for Bristol in the 2003–04 season. He played 49 matches for Gloucester Rugby and scored 11 tries. One of the most memorable tries that he scored was against London Wasps in May 2006 when James Simpson-Daniel ran rings around Lawrence Dallaglio and passed the ball to Bailey who rounded off a beautiful try.

He left Gloucester in August 2008 to pursue more first-team appearances elsewhere. A move to Toulon fell through, leaving Bailey as a free agent. He signed for London Irish in September 2008, before leaving in the summer of 2009, after just one season at the Exiles, to sign for Lyon in Pro D2.

Bailey is also a good sevens player and he has played for the England Sevens team several times and was a major factor in Gloucester Rugby winning the Middlesex 7s title in 2005.

References

External links
Gloucester Rugby profile
England profile

1983 births
Living people
Black British sportsmen
Bristol Bears players
English rugby union players
Gloucester Rugby players
London Irish players
Lyon OU players
Rugby union players from London
Wasps RFC players
Rugby union wings
People educated at Shiplake College
People educated at Millfield